Damian Lee is a Canadian film director, writer, and producer responsible as well as notable for such films as Abraxas, Guardian of the Universe, No Exit and Ski School. He started his own production company, Rose & Ruby Productions, in the 1980s.

Film

References

External links
 

Canadian film directors
Canadian film production company founders
Canadian male screenwriters
Living people
1950 births
20th-century Canadian screenwriters
20th-century Canadian male writers